Steven Springer (born Steven Anthony Springer) (September 23, 1951 – September 10, 2012) was an American guitarist and songwriter known for his innovative smooth soft touch guitar style. He was best known for being a member of the Trinidad Tripoli Steel Band and for playing with Sir Lancelot Pinard, Arizona-based band Sanctuary, as well as founding the musical project Tropicooljazz.

Background and early career
Steven Springer grew up in Port of Spain, Trinidad, and attended St. Mary's College. He started a band while in high school, and quickly became a very popular and sought-after guitarist, and was a regular fixture at local dances and parties. He left Trinidad to attend college at the Mayfield College, Sussex, England.

Music career

Sanctuary
After graduation, Steven moved to Phoenix, Arizona, and formed a band called Sanctuary, which rose to fame, winning local awards for "Band of The Year" for three consecutive years, as well as "Album of the Year," during the 1980s.

Sir Lancelot
Steven Springer and Brian Pinard performed as "The Knights of The Holy Trinity" to accompany Brian Pinard's uncle, famous calypso artist Sir Lancelot. They recorded Sir Lancelot's final album, called Pinaryhymns – Religious Calypso.

Trinidad Calypso Band
Touring worldwide, Springer was a featured artist at the 1988 World's Fair in Brisbane, Queensland, Australia, performing with the Trinidad Calypso Band.

Trinidad Tripoli Steel Band
Upon returning to the United States, Springer moved to Michigan and joined Hugh Borde's world-famous Trinidad Tripoli Steel Band, performing and recording with them for over ten years. While in Trinidad Tripoli Steel Band, Steven performed with Robert Greenidge, Othello Molineaux, and Marcus Belgrave and also shared the stage with The Wailers, Eek-A-Mouse and Arrow.

NiteFlight
Steven teamed up with Joseph Allen (keyboards, vocals), Dector Scott (bass guitar, vocals), Norris George (steel drum), and Robert Valentine (steel drums) to form NiteFlight Caribbean Band. They were soon playing large festivals, such as the Ann Arbor Summer Festival, Motown Winter Blast, Arts, Beats and Eats, and African World Festival. NiteFlight won awards for best Road Band at the Detroit International Caribbean Festival.

Tropicooljazz
Inspired by a visit to Trinidad, Steven Springer decided to write and record some new songs, featuring a new style of jazz he dubbed "Tropicooljazz," which was a melting pot of all of the music that has influenced him: calypso, soca, jazz, reggae, Latin, blues, rock and R&B. He recorded the first Tropicooljazz CD by collaborating with musicians from all over the world via the internet. Springer then followed up that release with another visit to Trinidad and another CD release, "Tropicooljazz 2" which featured more songs that were written about and inspired by Trinidad and Tobago, as well as his personal battle with cancer. Normally known for his instrumental releases, "Three Came For Me" features vocal tracks by a wide variety of well-known Caribbean and jazz artists. "Tropicooljazz 4.0" features a unique collection of songs which highlight Steven's world music background, while continuing to develop the Tropicool sound.

Jungle
In 2010, Steven began a musical project with drummer and percussionist Muruga Booker as well as bass guitarist Dave Sharp consisting of a fusion of world, funk, rock, Caribbean and tropical jazz. They released a self-titled CD in late 2010 that was recorded live at Muruga's Sage Ct. Studio in Ann Arbor, Michigan.

Steven & Steven
In 2010, Springer recorded a duet project with Muruga Booker entitled Spirit Fire.

Awards
Springer was chosen "Best Guitar Player," every year from 1990 to 1993, at the annual Detroit Music Awards.

Influences
Growing up in Trinidad, Springer was inspired by the melodic lilting sound of soca and calypso, and he started playing guitar at a young age. He was intrigued by the fusion of many different cultures and beautiful natural features of Trinidad, and loved to listen to the steel bands perform at Carnival. After hearing The Ventures records and seeing The Merrymen perform he quickly learned to play guitar.

Personal life

Family
Steven Springer was married to Denise Dooley, and they lived in Ann Arbor, Michigan. He was formerly married to Karen Bronski, who died due to cancer. He had three children with his first wife: Venissa, Sarah and John Paul.

Equipment

Guitars

Steven Springer endorsed and played Xaviere guitars, and Alden Guitars.  He also used Hamer, Ovation and BLB sound. He used GuitarHeads pickups. He also often played a Fender Telecaster custom and a Yamaha SBG2000, as well as customized Gibson Les Paul guitars. He used GHS Boomers guitar strings (11 gauge), and Line 6 amplifiers and processors. He usually did not use any guitar picks, but when he did he used Jim Dunlop 88s.

Partial discography
This is only a partial discography.  Steven Springer performed on more than 25 albums, as well as a guest artist on countless recordings. His song "Shashee" was released by Sony Music as part of a CD compilation.

Sanctuary
Sanctuary
Sanctuary 2
Sanctuary 3

Sir Lancelot
Pinardhymns – Religious Calypso

Trinidad Tripoli Steel Band
Trinidad Tripoli Live'''HOTLIKEFIRENiteFlightNiteFlight CaribbeanSpeaking OutNiteFlight.usTropicooljazzTropicooljazzTropicooljazz 2Three Came For MeTropicooljazz 4.0My StandardsMy StoriesJungleJungleSteven and StevenSpirit FireSoloCaribbean CasinoCaribbean Collection 1Caribbean Collection 2Satisfyingly''

References

External links
 The Official Steven Springer site

1951 births
2012 deaths
American male guitarists
People from Ann Arbor, Michigan
Trinidad and Tobago musicians
American male songwriters
American world music musicians
Lead guitarists
Songwriters from Michigan
Guitarists from Michigan
20th-century American guitarists
20th-century American male musicians